Joel Albert McCrea (November 5, 1905 – October 20, 1990) was an American actor whose career spanned a wide variety of genres over almost five decades, including comedy, drama, romance, thrillers, adventures, and Westerns, for which he became best known.

He appeared in over one hundred films, starring in over eighty, among them Alfred Hitchcock's espionage thriller Foreign Correspondent (1940), Preston Sturges' comedy classics Sullivan's Travels (1941), and The Palm Beach Story (1942), the romance film Bird of Paradise (1932), the adventure classic The Most Dangerous Game (1932), Gregory La Cava's bawdy comedy Bed of Roses (1933), George Stevens' six-time Academy Award nominated romantic comedy The More the Merrier (1943), William Wyler's These Three, Come and Get It (both 1936) and Dead End (1937), Howard Hawks' Barbary Coast (1935), and a number of western films, including Wichita (1955) as Wyatt Earp and Sam Peckinpah's Ride the High Country (1962), opposite Randolph Scott.

He starred in a total of three Best Picture Oscar nominees: Dead End (1937), Foreign Correspondent (1940), and The More the Merrier (1943).

With the exception of the British thriller Rough Shoot (1953) and film noir Hollywood Story (1951), McCrea appeared in Western films exclusively from 1946 until his retirement in 1976.

Early life
McCrea was born in South Pasadena, California, the son of Thomas McCrea, an executive with the L.A. Gas & Electric Company, and Louise "Lou" Whipple. As a boy, he had a paper route delivering the Los Angeles Times to Cecil B. DeMille and other people in the film industry.  He also had the opportunity to watch D. W. Griffith filming Intolerance, and was an extra in a serial starring Ruth Roland.

McCrea graduated from Hollywood High School and then Pomona College (class of 1928.) There he had acted on stage and took courses in drama and public speaking, while also appearing regularly at the Pasadena Playhouse. In 1928 he also met Wyatt Earp in Hollywood - later in 1955, McCrea would portray Earp in the film, Wichita. As a high school student McCrea worked as a stunt double and held horses for Hollywood cowboy stars William S. Hart and Tom Mix. McCrea had a love and understanding of horses from an early time, and later he was considered one of the best riders in Western films.

The strapping 6'2½" McCrea variously worked as an extra, stunt man, and bit player from 1927 to 1928, when he signed a contract with MGM. He was cast in a major role in The Jazz Age (1929), and got his first leading role that same year in The Silver Horde. He moved to RKO in 1930, where he established himself as a handsome and versatile leading man capable of starring in both dramas and comedies.

Career

In the 1930s, McCrea starred in the controversial pre-code film, Bird of Paradise (1932), directed by King Vidor, co-starring with Dolores del Río. In RKO's The Sport Parade (1932), McCrea and William Gargan are friends on the Dartmouth football team, who are shown snapping towels at each other in the locker room, while other players are taking a shower. In 1932 he starred with Fay Wray in The Most Dangerous Game – which used some of the same jungle sets built for King Kong (1933) as well as cast members Wray and Robert Armstrong, and was filmed at night while King Kong was filmed during the day. He was originally intended for the character Jack Driscoll in King Kong, but he turned down the role because he didn't want to become typecast in "jungle films". The role subsequently went to Bruce Cabot.
 
In 1934 he made his first appearances with two leading ladies he would be paired with often, Miriam Hopkins in The Richest Girl in the World, the first of their five films together, and Barbara Stanwyck in Gambling Lady, the first of their six pairings.

Later in the decade he was the first actor to play "Dr. Kildare", in the film Internes Can't Take Money (1937), and starred in two large-scale Westerns, Wells Fargo (1937) with his wife Frances Dee, and Cecil B. DeMille's Union Pacific (1939).

McCrea reached the peak of his early career in the early 1940s, in Alfred Hitchcock's  thriller Foreign Correspondent (1940), a romantic comedy, The More the Merrier (1943), directed by George Stevens, and two comedies by Preston Sturges: Sullivan's Travels (1941) and The Palm Beach Story (1942). While shooting Sullivan's Travels, it was an on-set joke that tall McCrea's leading lady, Veronica Lake, had to stand on a box for some shots, as she was reportedly 16 inches shorter than McCrea, and it was otherwise impossible to get both of their heads in the same shot.

McCrea turned down playing in a number of films; he was offered the lead role in The Postman Always Rings Twice (1946) but he refused, saying "This character is too much of a gigolo. I don't like his moral standards." Among other movies he declined were Spitfire (1934), The Impatient Years (1944), Intruder in the Dust (1949), and The Story of Will Rogers (1952). During World War II, McCrea refused to portray military heroes, with the explanation, "Since I was too old to be called, I was too old for that kind of a show". He was also notoriously modest about his acting abilities, and would say that he didn't feel good enough to play certain parts. He also preferred playing roles that he could see himself in. Despite his own opinion of his acting, Katharine Hepburn reportedly felt that he was one of the best actors with whom she had worked. She believed McCrea should have been ranked alongside Spencer Tracy or Humphrey Bogart.

McCrea also starred in two William A. Wellman Westerns, The Great Man's Lady (1942), again with Stanwyck, and Buffalo Bill (1944), with character actor Edgar Buchanan and a young Maureen O'Hara.  After the success of the film The Virginian in 1946, McCrea made Westerns exclusively for the rest of his career, with two exceptions: an uncredited role in the 1951 film noir Hollywood Story and the British-made Rough Shoot (1953).

By that time the multi-millionaire McCrea had long been working his own ranch in Ventura County outside of L.A..  Specializing in Westerns was not merely a return to what he had done earlier in his career, but a genre he immensely enjoyed.  As he described it (in a 1978 interview): I liked doing comedies, but as I got older I was better suited to do Westerns. Because I think it becomes unattractive for an older fellow trying to look young, falling in love with attractive girls in those kinds of situations.... Anyway, I always felt so much more comfortable in the Western. The minute I got a horse and a hat and a pair of boots on, I felt easier. I didn't feel like I was an actor anymore. I felt like I was the guy out there doing it.

On November 19, 1950, McCrea appeared on Television Theatre in an adaptation of Foreign Correspondent. In the early 1950s, McCrea starred as Jace Pearson on the radio series western, Tales of the Texas Rangers. In 1955 he was Wyatt Earp in Wichita directed by Jacques Tourneur. The Hollywood Foreign Press Association awarded the film with "Best Picture – Outdoor Drama" that year.

In 1959, McCrea and his son Jody starred in the brief NBC-TV series Wichita Town. Earlier he had turned down the lead in Rawhide, feeling it would make too heavy a workload. A few years later, McCrea united with fellow veteran of westerns Randolph Scott in Ride the High Country (1962), directed by Sam Peckinpah, after which he did not make another feature film until The Young Rounders (1966).  Four more years were to pass before his next film, but 1970 saw the release of two: Cry Blood, Apache, again with his son Jody, and Sioux Nation. He made his final film appearance in 1976, in Mustang Country.

Awards
In 1968, McCrea received a career achievement award from the L.A. Film Critics Association, and the following year he was inducted into the Hall of Great Western Performers at the National Cowboy & Western Heritage Museum in Oklahoma City, Oklahoma.

For his contribution to the motion picture industry, McCrea has a star on the Hollywood Walk of Fame at 6901 Hollywood Blvd. and another star at 6241 Hollywood Blvd. for his contribution to radio.

He was also a winner of the Golden Boot Award in 1987, the Golden Laurel Award in 1951, a Photoplay Award in 1939 for his performance in Union Pacific, the Silver Medallion Award in 1982, and the Trustees Award in 1976 for the film, Mustang Country.

Personal life
McCrea married actress Frances Dee in Rye, New York on October 20, 1933, after they met while filming The Silver Cord. Coincidentally, Dee was born only a few blocks away from McCrea's home, but she moved to Chicago during her childhood. They had three sons, Jody, Peter and David. They were married until McCrea's death 57 years later.

McCrea – who was an outdoorsman who had once listed his occupation as "rancher" and his hobby as "acting" – had begun buying property as early as 1933, when he purchased his first  in a then unincorporated area of eastern Ventura County, California, which later became Thousand Oaks, California. This was the beginning of what evolved into a  spread where McCrea and his wife lived, raised their sons, and rode their horses. At one point, McCrea's ranch produced 200,000 pounds of beef every year. He was noted for being a hard worker on his ranch; he was very active in the management, including riding, roping and branding.

By the end of the 1940s, McCrea was a multi-millionaire, as much from his real-estate dealings as from his movie stardom. It is said that McCrea once joked that he "only acted so he could afford to ranch." In the early 1960s, he sold  of land to an oil company  on the condition that they would not drill within sight of his home. McCrea's perspicacity may have stemmed from his friendship in the 1930s with fellow personality and sometime actor Will Rogers. McCrea recounted that "the Oklahoma Sage" gave him a profound piece of advice: "Save half of what you make, and live on just the other half."

McCrea supported Thomas Dewey in the 1944 United States presidential election, Barry Goldwater in the 1964 United States presidential election, and Ronald Reagan in the 1966 California gubernatorial election.

McCrea made his final public appearance on October 3, 1990, at a fundraiser for Republican gubernatorial candidate Pete Wilson in Beverly Hills.  He died less than three weeks later on October 20, at the Motion Picture & Television Country House and Hospital in Woodland Hills, California from pneumonia at the age of 84.

After his death his family ultimately donated thirty five acres of McCrea's former ranch to the newly formed Conejo Valley YMCA for the city of Thousand Oaks, California. They also donated 75 acres to the Conejo Open Space Conservancy Agency (COSCA), which designated it the Joel McCrea Wildlife Preserve; and five acres to the Boys and Girls Club of Camarillo.

Partial filmography

 Torrent (1926, stunts)
 The Fair Co-Ed (1927) as Student (uncredited)
 The Enemy (1927) as Extra (uncredited)
 The Five O'Clock Girl (1928) as Oswald
 Dead Man's Curve (1928) (uncredited)
 Freedom of the Press (1928) (uncredited)
 The Jazz Age (1929) as Todd Sayles
 The Divine Lady (1929) as Extra (uncredited)
 The Single Standard (1929) as Blythe – One of the Philandering Men (uncredited)
 So This Is College (1929) as Bruce Nolan (uncredited)
 Dynamite (1929) as Marco – Her Boy Friend
 Framed (1930) as Waiter at the Casino Club (uncredited)
 The Silver Horde (1930) as Boyd Emerson
 Lightnin' (1930) as John Marvin
 Once a Sinner (1931) as Tommy Mason
 Kept Husbands (1931) as Richard 'Dick' Brunton
 Born to Love (1931) as Barry Craig
 The Common Law (1931) as John Neville
 Girls About Town (1931) as Jim Baker
 Business and Pleasure (1932) as Lawrence Ogle
 The Lost Squadron (1932) as Red
 Bird of Paradise (1932) as Johnny Baker
 The Most Dangerous Game (1932) as Bob Rainsford
 The Sport Parade (1932) as Sandy Brown
 Rockabye (1932) as Jacobs Van Riker Pell
 Scarlet River (1933) as Joel McCrea (uncredited)
 The Silver Cord (1933) as David Phelps
 Bed of Roses (1933) as Dan
 One Man's Journey (1933) as Jimmy Watt
 Chance at Heaven (1933) as Blacky Gorman
 Gambling Lady (1934) as Garry Madison
 Half a Sinner (1934) as John Adams
 The Richest Girl in the World (1934) as Tony
 Private Worlds (1935) as Dr. Alex MacGregor
 Our Little Girl (1935) as Dr. Donald Middleton
 Woman Wanted (1935) as Tony Baxter
 Barbary Coast (1935) as Jim Carmichael
 Splendor (1935) as Brighton Lorrimore
 These Three (1936) as Dr. Joseph Cardin
 Two in a Crowd (1936) as Larry Stevens
 Adventure in Manhattan (1936) as George Melville
 Come and Get It (1936) as Richard Glasgow
 Banjo on My Knee (1936) as Ernie Holley
 Internes Can't Take Money (1937) as James Kildare
 Woman Chases Man (1937) as Kenneth Nolan
 Dead End (1937) as Dave
 Wells Fargo (1937) as Ramsay MacKay
 Three Blind Mice (1938) as Van Dam Smith
 Youth Takes a Fling (1938) as Joe Meadows
 Union Pacific (1939) as Jeff Butler
 They Shall Have Music (1939) as Peter
 Espionage Agent (1939) as Barry Corvall
 He Married His Wife (1940) as T.H. Randall
 Primrose Path (1940) as Ed Wallace
 Foreign Correspondent (1940) as John Jones
 Reaching for the Sun (1941) as Russ Eliot
 Sullivan's Travels (1941) as an itinerant film director.
 The Great Man's Lady (1942) as Ethan Hoyt
 The Palm Beach Story (1942) as Tom Jeffers
 The More the Merrier (1943) as Joe Carter
 Buffalo Bill (1944) as William Frederick 'Buffalo Bill' Cody
 The Great Moment (1944) as William Thomas Green Morton
 The Unseen (1945) as David Fielding
 The Virginian (1946) as The Virginian
 Ramrod (1947) as Dave Nash
 Four Faces West (1948) as Ross McEwen
 South of St. Louis (1949) as Kip Davis
 Colorado Territory (1949) as Wes McQueen
 The Outriders  (1950) as Will Owen
 Stars in My Crown (1950) as Josiah Doziah Gray
 Saddle Tramp (1950) as Chuck Conner
 Frenchie (1950) as Sheriff Tom Banning
 Hollywood Story (1951) as Joel McCrea
 Cattle Drive (1951) as Dan Mathews
 The San Francisco Story (1952) as Rick Nelson
 The Lone Hand (1953) as Zachary Hallock
 Rough Shoot (1953) as Taine
 Border River (1954) as Clete Mattson
 Black Horse Canyon (1954) as Del Rockwell
 Stranger on Horseback (1955) as Judge Richard 'Rick' Thorne
 Wichita (1955) as Wyatt Earp
 The First Texan (1956) as Sam Houston
 The Oklahoman (1957) as Dr. John M. Brighton
 Trooper Hook (1957) as Sgt. Clovis Hook
 Gunsight Ridge (1957) as Mike Ryan
 The Tall Stranger (1957) as Ned Bannon
 Cattle Empire (1958) as John Cord
 Fort Massacre (1958) as Sgt. Vinson
 The Gunfight at Dodge City (1959) as Bat Masterson
 The Crowning Experience (1960) as Prologue narrator
 Ride the High Country (1962) as Steve Judd
 The Young Rounders (1966)
 Cry Blood, Apache (1970) as Pitcalin as an Older Man
 Sioux Nation (1970)
 Mustang Country (1976) as Dan (final film role)

Radio appearances
 Forsaking All Others - with Bette Davis in 1938.
This Is Hollywood – "Along Came Jones" (1946)
 Tales of the Texas Rangers - 1950 to 1952

References

Further reading
 Nott, Robert Last of the Cowboy Heroes: The Westerns of Randolph Scott, Joel McCrea, and Audie Murphy, 2000, McFarland & Company, Inc.,

External links

 
 
 
 Photographs and literature
 Joel McCrea Wildlife Preserve
 Joel McCrea Ranch Foundation
 McCrea Ranch 

1905 births
1990 deaths
American people of Scottish descent
20th-century American male actors
American male film actors
American male radio actors
20th-century American businesspeople
California Republicans
Deaths from pneumonia in California
People from South Pasadena, California
Metro-Goldwyn-Mayer contract players
Pomona College alumni
Male Western (genre) film actors
Paramount Pictures contract players
RKO Pictures contract players